Dixie GO Station is a GO Transit railway station on the Milton line in the Dixie neighbourhood of Mississauga, Ontario, Canada. It is located at 2445 Dixie Road, just south of Dundas Street East.

Like most GO stations, Dixie offers parking facilities for commuters, and allows for wheelchair-accessible train services through a raised mini-platform giving access to the 5th carriage from the locomotive; it is one of the only three stations on the Milton Line (excluding Union Station) that offer the mini-platform. The station building houses a ticket sales agent and a waiting room.

Although ridership is growing on the Milton line including at Dixie, GO cannot increase its services here at present because the line is shared with busy Canadian Pacific Railway freight trains. Frequent weekday GO buses serving the station help alleviate the demand.

In order to increase capacity on the Milton line, GO plan to extend Dixie's platform to accommodate twelve-carriage trains once more powerful locomotives capable of pulling such trains have entered service in 2008.

Connecting transit
MiWay, formerly Mississauga Transit, serves the station with one on-street bus line. Route 5 Dixie passes outside the station entrance.

References

External links

GO Transit railway stations
Galt Subdivision
Railway stations in Mississauga
Railway stations in Canada opened in 1981
1981 establishments in Ontario